City Rockers: A Tribute To The Clash is a tribute album to the punk rock band The Clash.

Track listing
"Death or Glory" – Dave Smalley
"Clampdown" – Hot Water Music
"Hate & War" – Murphy's Law
"Hateful" – Kid Dynamite
"Clash City Rockers" – Saves the Day
"Guns of Brixton" – Dropkick Murphys
"Brand New Cadillac" – Incognegro
"Rock the Casbah" – Demonspeed
"Lost in the Supermarket" – Lady Luck
"Should I Stay or Should I Go" – Error Type 11
"Lose this Skin" – Stubborn All-Stars
"London Calling" – One King Down
"Train In Vain" – Ill Repute
"Garageland" – The Sick
"White Riot" – Fang
"Career Opportunities" – Stigmata
"Straight to Hell" – Skinnerbox
"Tommy Gun" – The Mob

References

External links 

 

Punk rock compilation albums
1999 compilation albums
The Clash tribute albums